is a 1990 Japanese film directed by Hideyuki Hirayama.

Cast
 Haruko Sagara as Shoko
 Akira Emoto as Eshima
 Makoto Otake as Yasui
 Bunjaku Han as Maria

References

External links
 

1990 films
Films directed by Hideyuki Hirayama
1990s Japanese films